Bad Asses on the Bayou (also known as Bad Ass 3) is a 2015 American action film starring Danny Trejo and Danny Glover, written and directed by Craig Moss. The film is the third part of the Bad Ass trilogy.

Plot synopsis
Frank Vega and Bernie Pope return, this time to Louisiana in an attempt to find a kidnapped friend.

Cast
 Danny Trejo as Frank Vega
 Danny Glover as Bernie Pope
 John Amos as Earl
 Loni Love as Carmen
 Jimmy Bennett as Ronald
 Olga Wilhemine as Violinist
 Jaqueline Fleming as Katie
 Judd Lormand as Detective Williamson
 Sammi Rotibi as Geoffrey
 Rob Mello as Buford
 Al Vicente as Guillermo Gomez
 Deborah Ayorinde as Taryn
 Lucius Baston as H.S. Security Guard
 Miles Doleac as Talk Show Host
 Keith Loneker as Pierre
 Carol Sutton as Lois Morgan

Release 
The release date of the film was announced in December 2014. The film was released in theaters on March 6, 2015 and on DVD on April 7, 2015.

References

External links

2015 films
2015 action films
American action films
2010s English-language films
American independent films
American vigilante films
American sequel films
Films set in Los Angeles
Films set in Louisiana
Films directed by Craig Moss
2010s American films